Gas House Gang was a barbershop quartet that won the 1993 SPEBSQSA International Quartet Competition. They started singing as a group in 1987 in St. Louis Missouri. After winning the 1988 Central States District Competition in their first attempt, they began a steady climb up the International Competition ladder which culminated in Calgary, Alberta, Canada, where they were awarded the 1993 International Quartet Championship.

Performances 
The Gas House Gang toured the United States and they performed in all fifty states in the U.S. They also sang extensively in Canada and performed around the world, singing in 15 countries.

Major highlights included:

 Singing on a PBS special with Marquis (quartet), "Voices in Harmony"
 NPR's "At the Creation"
 NBC's Today Show
 BBC Radio
 Singing at Carnegie Hall three times
 Singing on the stage at the Grand Ole Opry
 Professional productions of The Music Man with the St. Louis Symphony Orchestra at The Muny
 Cruise ship performances
 Performers with whom they shared the stage include The Four Freshmen, The Swingle Singers, Rockapella, The Persuasions, The Chordettes, The King's Singers, the St. Louis Symphony Orchestra, Victor Borge, Porter Wagoner, GLAD and the Grammy award-winning group Chanticleer.
 They produced five recordings
 They were awarded nominations and awards by the Contemporary A Cappella Society of America (CASA), including Best Barbershop Song, Studio Album of the Year, Artist of the Year, Best Christmas Album, and Best Christmas Song.
 They were named to the Barbershop Harmony Society's Hall of Fame in 2008.

On June 3, 2004, the quartet announced their retirement at the end of 2005. The quartet still occasionally does reunion shows.

As a part of their 25th-anniversary performance on the 2018 Association of International Champions Show, the Gas House Gang shared a tribute to their original baritone Rob Henry, with some help from his son, Ryan.

Contest placement

International

Central States District (CSD) 

 1988 – 1st

Members

 Original tenor: Joe Fink (1988–1990)

 Winning members:
 Tenor: Kipp Buckner
 Lead: Rich Knight
 Bari: Rob Henry
 Bass: Jim Henry

 Kipp Buckner began singing barbershop when he was 14 with the Louisville Thoroughbreds chorus and international championship victories in 1981 and 1984. He is one of two men to have won the International Champion Quartet Medal three times. (Jeff Oxley also won three, with Acoustix, The Rapscallions, and Max Q.) Buckner won his three gold medals with the GHG in 1993, the Interstate Rivals in 1987, and Old School in 2011. Buckner sang with the Ambassadors of Harmony for their first international championship victory in 2004 in his hometown of Louisville, Kentucky.
 Jim Henry, PhD joined the society at the age of 11 as a member of the Daniel Boone Chorus, which became the Ambassadors of Harmony. He became the director of the Ambassadors in 1991 and went on to lead the chorus to 15 medals including 4 gold medals (2004, 2009, 2012 and 2016). In 2009 when Crossdroads won, Jim became the only man in BHS history to direct the winning chorus and win with his quartet in the same year. In 2019, he was inducted to the Barbershop Harmony Society's Hall of Fame.Henry's 2000 doctoral dissertation on the African American origins of barbershop harmony and his 2007 Harmony University keynote address, "Gold Medal Moments" have influenced the study, philosophy, and discourse of barbershop harmony.
 Rich Knight has sung with the Ambassadors of Harmony since the 1970s and has been part of each championship. His lead voice creates the defining sound of the GHG. He is an active member in the Central States District. He is an active coach and clinician, teaching at district events, Harmony University and International Barbershop events.
 Rob Henry, the quartet's baritone, was diagnosed with esophageal cancer on May 30, 2003, and died shortly thereafter on September 4, 2003.

Several prominent barbershop singers helped fill in after Rob's death, to fulfill show obligations.

Replacement baritone members:

 Mike Slamka (Power Play and Crossroads)
 Brandon Guyton (Four Voices and Crossroads)
 DJ Hiner (The Ritz)
 Tony DeRosa (Keepsake, Platinum, Max Q, and Main Street)
 Jonny Moroni (Vocal Spectrum)

Discography/recordings

References

External links
 AIC entry
Gas House Gang Facebook Page

Professional a cappella groups
Barbershop quartets
Barbershop Harmony Society